Thixotropy is a time-dependent shear thinning property. Certain gels or fluids that are thick or viscous under static conditions will flow (become thinner, less viscous) over time when shaken, agitated, shear-stressed, or otherwise stressed (time-dependent viscosity). They then take a fixed time to return to a more viscous state.
Some non-Newtonian pseudoplastic fluids show a time-dependent change in viscosity; the longer the fluid undergoes shear stress, the lower its viscosity.  A thixotropic fluid is a fluid which takes a finite time to attain equilibrium viscosity when introduced to a steep change in shear rate. Some thixotropic fluids return to a gel state almost instantly, such as ketchup, and are called pseudoplastic fluids. Others such as yogurt take much longer and can become nearly solid. Many gels and colloids are thixotropic materials, exhibiting a stable form at rest but becoming fluid when agitated.  Thixotropy arises because particles or structured solutes require time to organize. An overview of thixotropy has been provided by Mewis and Wagner. 

Some fluids are anti-thixotropic: constant shear stress for a time causes an increase in viscosity or even solidification. Fluids which exhibit this property are sometimes called rheopectic. Anti-thixotropic fluids are less well documented than thixotropic fluids.

Natural examples

Some clays are thixotropic, with their behavior of great importance in structural and geotechnical engineering. Landslides, such as those common in the cliffs around Lyme Regis, Dorset and in the Aberfan spoil tip disaster in Wales are evidence of this phenomenon. Similarly, a lahar is a mass of earth liquefied by a volcanic event, which rapidly solidifies once coming to rest.

Drilling muds used in geotechnical applications can be thixotropic. Honey from honey bees may also exhibit this property under certain conditions (such as heather honey or mānuka honey).

Both cytoplasm and the ground substance in the human body are thixotropic, as is semen.

Some clay deposits found in the process of exploring caves exhibit thixotropism: an initially solid-seeming mudbank will turn soupy and yield up moisture when dug into or otherwise disturbed. These clays were deposited in the past by low-velocity streams which tend to deposit fine-grained sediment.

A thixotropic fluid is best visualised by an oar blade embedded in mud. Pressure on the oar often results in a highly viscous (more solid) thixotropic mud on the high pressure side of the blade, and low viscosity (very fluid) thixotropic mud on the low pressure side of the oar blade. Flow from the high pressure side to the low pressure side of the oar blade is non-Newtonian. (i.e., fluid velocity is not linearly proportional to the square root of the pressure differential over the oar blade).

Applications

Many kinds of paints and inks—e.g., plastisols used in silkscreen textile printing—exhibit thixotropic qualities. In many cases it is desirable for the fluid to flow sufficiently to form a uniform layer, then to resist further flow, thereby preventing sagging on a vertical surface. Some other inks, such as those used in CMYK-type process printing, are designed to regain viscosity even faster, once they are applied, in order to protect the structure of the dots for accurate color reproduction.

Thixotropic ink (along with a gas pressurized cartridge and special shearing ball design) is a key feature of the Fisher Space Pen, used for writing during zero gravity space flights by the US and Russian space programs.

Solder pastes used in electronics manufacturing printing processes are thixotropic.

Thread-locking fluid is a thixotropic adhesive that cures anaerobically.

Thixotropy has been proposed as a scientific explanation of blood liquefaction miracles such as that of Saint Januarius in Naples.

Semi-solid casting processes such as thixomoulding use the thixotropic property of some alloys (mostly light metals like magnesium). Within certain temperature ranges and with appropriate preparation, an alloy can be put into a semi-solid state, which can be injected with less shrinkage and better overall properties than by normal injection molding.

Fumed silica is commonly used as a rheology agent to make otherwise low-viscous fluids thixotropic. Examples range from foods to epoxy resin in structural bonding applications like fillet joints.

Etymology
The word comes from Ancient Greek θίξις thixis 'touch' (from thinganein 'to touch') and -tropy, -tropous, from Ancient Greek -τρόπος -tropos 'of turning', from τρόπος tropos 'a turn', from τρέπειν trepein, 'to turn'.  It was invented by Herbert Freundlich originally for a sol-gel transformation.

See also
Bingham plastic
Calcium Sulfate
Dilatant
Kaye effect
Nanocellulose
Polymer
Silly putty

References

External links

Continuum mechanics
Fluid dynamics
Non-Newtonian fluids
Soil mechanics
Soil physics
Tribology